Michael J. Meade D.H.L. (born January 16, 1944) is an American author, mythologist, storyteller, and was a figure in the Men's Movement of the 1980s. Having distanced himself from the Men's Movement, he continues to publish and teach to a broader audience.

His essays have appeared in To Be A Man, Tending the Fire, Wingspan, Walking Swiftly, and The Rag and Bone Shop of the Heart. The latter is an anthology of poetry, which he edited with Robert Bly and James Hillman. His book Men and the Water of Life: Initiation and the Tempering of Men was published in 1993 by HarperSanFrancisco. He is the author of the books The Water of Life,  The World Behind the World, Fate and Destiny, the Two Agreements in Life, and Why the World Doesn't End, Tales of Renewal in Times of Change. He frequently contributes essays to Huffington Post, and Sun Magazine. Meade uses story and mythology as a means of discovery for others to find their inner wisdom and inherent gifts, and he is among those interviewed in the documentary Mythic Journeys, focused on other leading figures as per above Robert Bly and James Hillman, and other leading figures of the Men's Movement.

Philanthropy
Michael J. Meade is the founder of the Mosaic Multicultural Foundation, a Seattle-based non-profit dedicated to education and culture. The focus of his current work is to bring healing through story and mythology to disaffected populations from many sectors of modern culture. He frequently works with at-risk youth, homeless populations, returning veterans, prisoners, and youth involved in gang life. Meade leads day-long workshops and residential retreats aimed at healing and personal growth. He collaborates in this multicultural work with figures such as Luis J. Rodriguez and Jack Kornfield.

He is adjunct faculty in depth psychology at Pacifica Graduate Institute, where his honorary degree comes from and often teaches programs on mythology and depth psychology, having earned a B.A. from Saint John's University.

Publications 
 Men and the Water of Life: Initiation and the Tempering of Men, 1994, 
 The Water of Life: Initiation and the Tempering of the Soul, 2006, 
 The World Behind the World: Living at the ends of time, 2008, 
 Fate and Destiny: The Two Agreements of the Soul, 2010, 
 Why the World Doesn't End, 2012, 
 The Genius Myth, 2016, 
 Awakening the Soul, 2018,

References

Living people
Men's movement
Mythopoeia
1944 births